Rediffusion Starview was an early premium cable television channel in the United Kingdom, operated by Rediffusion.

History

Operation
The Home Office had granted several experimental licenses to broadcast subscription television services, of which Rediffusion also received licenses for five different areas – Burnley, Hull, Pontypridd, Reading and Tunbridge Wells.

Starview was the first of these services launched on 9 September 1981, with its first showing of The Sea Wolves which had been only for cinema release a year earlier. The subscription cost varied from several towns – £8 in Hull and £12 in Reading – were available around 22,000 homes served by Rediffusion's cable service, although it is illegal to copy this film onto domestic recorders (such as VHS, Betamax and Video 2000) by preventing piracy. Schedules for weekdays consisted of two daily slots (7.00pm and 9.00pm) with Fridays and Saturdays also featuring an 11.00pm slot for X-rated films, whilst Sundays offered a matinée showing at 5.00pm, as well as non-movie content for special events which include Rod Stewart's Tonight I'm Yours concert was broadcast on 1 January 1982.

Other early British cable television services started around the same time during 1981 were: Showcable (Visionhire/BBC Enterprises) on 15 October, and Cinematel (Radio Rentals/Thorn EMI) on 6 November.

Demise
Starview struggled to make a huge impact where the channel only had a 10% uptake was dropped by five remaining towns, with The Entertainment Network replacing it on the Rediffusion cable service from 29 March 1984.

See also
 Timeline of cable television in the United Kingdom
 List of former TV channels in the United Kingdom
 Sky Cinema (formerly Sky Movies)
 The Movie Channel
 Carlton Cinema
 Film4

References

External links
 Rediffusion Hull Starview, Rediffusion.info

Defunct television channels in the United Kingdom
Television channels and stations established in 1981
Television channels and stations disestablished in 1984
Movie channels in the United Kingdom
1980s in the United Kingdom
1980s in British television
History of television in the United Kingdom